Reyna Onald Thompson (born August 28, 1963) is a former American football defensive back in the National Football League for the New York Giants. He went to the Pro Bowl after the 1990 season as a special teams player.  He played college football at Baylor University and was drafted in the ninth round of the 1986 NFL Draft.  He was a star football player in high school at Thomas Jefferson H.S. in Dallas. He is retired and teaches high school English at Olympic Heights Community High School. In 2015, he served as head football coach for West Broward High School, leading the Bobcats to its first District playoff in the school's history. He also served as the head coach for Hollywood Hills High School football team.

1963 births
Living people
People from Dallas
American football safeties
Miami Dolphins players
New York Giants players
New England Patriots players
National Conference Pro Bowl players
Baylor Bears football players